Finanziaria may refer to:

 Italian financial law, a law that has to be presented every year before the 30th of September;
 Financial act (law).